Marin Leovac (born 7 August 1988) is a Croatian professional footballer who plays as a left back for NK Osijek.

Early career

Leovac began his career in July 1997 in Austria with Sportunion Aschbach and signed in March 2001 with USV Oed/Zeillern. After only one year left USV Oed/Zeillern and signed in August 2002 a contract with FK Austria Wien.

Club career

Austria Wien
Leovac spent three seasons playing for the Austria Wien II, before making debut for the first team in 2009/10 season.
He made his debut for Austria Wien in Europa League match against SV Werder Bremen, playing 90 minutes in eventual 2-0 loss. In his first season with Austria he made 8 Bundesliga appearances.

In 2013–2014 he helped Austria Wien reach UEFA Champions League group stage, when he netted the opening goal in 0-2 win over Croatian champions Dinamo Zagreb in Champions League Play-off match played in Zagreb. He made four appearances in 2013–2014 Champions League Group G.

Rijeka
In January 2014 Leovac signed with Croatian Prva HNL team HNK Rijeka, for a reported fee of €250,000. In his first half season with Rijeka he made 11 appearances in Prva HNL and helped the team win Croatian Cup.

PAOK
According to reports in Croatia PAOK are set to complete a deal for the Rijeka left back Marin Leovac. It is believed that the talks between the two parties are in an advanced stage and the clubs are due to agree a fee in the region of €1 million. PAOK manager Igor Tudor is a big admirer of the 26-year-old left back and the move, according to the Croatian reports, will be finalised soon. On 8 August 2015, according to reports in Croatia, HNK Rijeka left back Marin Leovac is heading to PAOK. Croatian reports believe that the 26-year-old left back has already agreed terms with PAOK and he is likely to complete the move imminently. Eventually, on 11 August 2015, PAOK have officially announced the transfer of Croatian left back Marin Leovac. The 27-year-old has signed a 4-year contract with the Greek club.
On 13 September 2015, Leovac injured during a Super League game against Veria. PAOK have been expecting updates on Leovac's injury and Igor Tudor was hopeful that it would not be anything serious. However the scans revealed that the problem was bigger than expected and it will force Leovac out of action for at least a month.

Leovac, who is in his third season with PAOK, is ready to leave Thessaloniki. Unable to cope with Răzvan Lucescu's demands, Leovac wants to find a new club for himself, claiming that PAOK cannot meet his expectations. Lucescu has inserted Vieirinha in the left-back role in place of Leovac and Dorian Lévêque, but PAOK understand their need to strengthen this area of the pitch if they're to have any chance of claiming an historic league title.

On 6 February 2018, PAOK reached an agreement with Leovac's ex-club HNK Rijeka on a six months loan until the end of the season, with a €1.3 million purchase option. Leovac remaining season's annual fee will be paid from his former club, as the player gave €150,000 of his contract, to sign with Rijeka.

Dinamo Zagreb
On 18 June he signed a contract with champions GNK Dinamo Zagreb for an estimated amount of €500,000. Leovac scored his first goal for Dinamo in a 3–0 win over Istra 1961, on 3 August 2018.

International career
In November 2014, after a string of good performances for HNK Rijeka, Leovac was called up for the Croatia national team friendly match against Argentina. He played full 90 minutes in his debut for the national team on November 12, 2014, in a friendly game against Argentina. On 27 October 2016, Leovac was called up in his motherland's national squad, after more than 13 months, ahead of the upcoming World Cup qualifier against Iceland. On 15 November 2016, he was a starter in a friendly away match against Northern Ireland. He earned a total of 5 caps, scoring no goals. His final international was a March 2019 European Championship qualification match away against Hungary.

Career statistics

Personal life
Leovac was born in the town of Jajce, in modern Bosnia and Herzegovina, which was at the time part of SFR Yugoslavia. He holds dual citizenship of Austria and Croatia. He was eligible to represent all three countries in international football. He ultimately opted to play for Croatia national team, making his debut in 2014.

Honours
Austria Wien
Austrian Bundesliga: 2012–13

Rijeka
Croatian Cup: 2013–14
Croatian Super Cup: 2014

PAOK
Greek Cup: 2016–17

Dinamo Zagreb
Prva HNL: 2018–19, 2019–20, 2020–21
Croatian Cup: 2020–21
Croatian Super Cup: 2019

Individual
Football Oscar Team of the Year: 2015

References

External links

1988 births
Living people
People from Jajce
People from Amstetten District
Footballers from Lower Austria
Yugoslav emigrants to Austria
Croats of Bosnia and Herzegovina
Austrian people of Croatian descent
Austrian people of Bosnia and Herzegovina descent
Association football fullbacks
Austrian footballers
Croatian footballers
Croatia international footballers
FK Austria Wien players
HNK Rijeka players
PAOK FC players
GNK Dinamo Zagreb players
NK Osijek players
Austrian Football Bundesliga players
Croatian Football League players
Super League Greece players
Austrian expatriate footballers
Croatian expatriate footballers
Expatriate footballers in Greece
Austrian expatriate sportspeople in Greece
Croatian expatriate sportspeople in Greece